Crambus sjoestedti is a moth in the family Crambidae. It was described by Per Olof Christopher Aurivillius in 1910. It is found in Kenya, South Africa, Sudan and Tanzania.

References

Crambini
Moths described in 1910
Moths of Africa